The Rainey Street Historic District is a street of historic homes, many of the bungalow style, in downtown Austin, Texas.

Rainey Street is positioned near Lady Bird Lake and Interstate 35 in the southeast corner of downtown. Though 21 buildings are specifically identified as a part of the historic district, the stretch of Rainey between River and Driskill includes 31 buildings built before 1934, giving the neighborhood a historic character relative to other areas of the city. The district includes  from 70 to 97 Rainey Street. It was added to the National Register of Historic Places in 1985. Since the early 2010s, the formerly sleepy residential street has turned into a popular nightlife district. Much of the historic homes have been renovated into bars and restaurants, many of which feature large porches and outdoor yards for patrons.

History
The Rainey Street neighborhood was first developed in 1884 by cattle baron Jesse Driskill and Frank Rainey, who subdivided 16 acres of land between the Colorado River and Water Street (now known as Cesar Chavez Blvd.) The neighborhood was initially populated by white, middle class tradesman, though by the 1920s the area began to see a larger influx of working class families and ethnic minorities. Many of the original homes in the neighborhood were lost in a flood in 1935. The construction of Interstate 35 left the Rainey Street neighborhood "isolated" from the remainder of Austin's residential neighborhoods; by 1978, a report estimated that more than half of the structures on Rainey Street were "dilapidated". In 1985, amid fears of high-density commercial and residential redevelopment, the neighborhood was added to the National Register of Historic Places.

Redevelopment
The Rainey Street neighborhood was rezoned as part of Austin's central business district in 2004. The hope at the time was to encourage development near the Austin Convention Center and the since-built Emma S. Barrientos Mexican American Cultural Center. But while grander development has stalled, bars and eateries have flocked to Rainey, since CBD zoning enables traffic-heavy cocktail bar or restaurant use without any additional zoning request. As such, old bungalows have been fixed up and turned into bars and cocktail lounges with ample backyards and porches. Indeed, there are many new bars under construction on Rainey 
Street: Banger's Sausage House and Beer Garden, the Blackheart, Javelina, Jack and Diane's and Rainey Street Bar are all under various stages of construction/rehabilitation.

Rainey Street remains dominated by single-family homes. Its National Register status has become controversial as land values surrounding the district have skyrocketed, leaving most of the home's worth significantly less than the land they sit on. New developments nearby, including multiple high-rise condominium buildings and Austin's new Mexican-American Cultural Center, have contributed greatly to this.

Deliberations are underway within the city government to develop a long-term plan for the area that allows redevelopment while preserving the street's historic and residential character. Since none of the individual buildings within the district have been designated as historic structures, they are eligible for demolition, though each building destroyed must be approved by the city's historic landmark commission.

In popular culture
On the Texas-themed TV series King of the Hill, the main characters live on "Rainey Street" in the fictional Arlen, Texas. Show creator Mike Judge is an Austin resident.

References

External links

 Rainey Street slideshow on Flickr
 http://chowpapi.com/wordpress/wordpress-2.8.6/wordpress/?p=1384

Neighborhoods in Austin, Texas
National Register of Historic Places in Austin, Texas
Historic districts on the National Register of Historic Places in Texas
Houses on the National Register of Historic Places in Texas